Theophilus Antecessor was a Byzantine jurist, translator from Latin to Greek and teacher.

Biography 
Theophilus lived in Constantinople during the 6th century. He is last mentioned in AD 533.

Works 
Theophilus, working with Tribonian and Dorotheus, authored the Institutiones, the first section of the Corpus Juris Civilis, by authority and order of the emperor Justinian. He also was heavily involved in the compilation of the Codex vetus and the Digesta.

Const. Tanta also informs that he was the compiler of a Greek paraphrase of the Institutiones as well as the indices to at least the first 19 volumes (out of 50) of the Digesta.

His paraphrase is the only juridical work in Greek from the times of Justinian to have survived almost in its entirety.

References

Bibliography 
 

Byzantine jurists
6th-century Byzantine writers
6th-century jurists
6th-century deaths
Justinian I